Kandi may refer to:

Geography
Kandi, Benin, a town, arrondissement, and commune in Benin
Kandi I, Kandi II, and Kandi III, arrondissements (administrative divisions) in Benin
Kandi, Iran, in Fars Province, Iran
Kandi, Balochistan, a town in Balochistan, Pakistan
Kandi, Murshidabad, a town in West Bengal, India
Kandi subdivision, a subdivision of Murshidabad district
Kandi (community development block), in Murshidabad district
Kandi (Vidhan Sabha constituency), in Murshidabad district
Kandi, Ardabil, a village in Iran

People
Kandi Burruss (born 1976), a rhythm and blues singer/songwriter
Daniel Kandi (born 1983), a Danish trance producer and disc jockey
Kandi, fictional ex-girlfriend of Alan Harper (Two and a Half Men)
 Ibrahim Wisan (born 1977), a Maldivian cinematographer, actor and director nicknamed Kandi

Other uses
Kandi Technologies, Chinese manufacturer of electric cars
Kandi, the name of the tree Prosopis cineraria in the Sindhi language
Kandi bracelet, often worn at American raves
"Kandi", the third single from Arash's second album Donya (album)
"Kandi", a single by One Eskimo

See also
 Candi (disambiguation)
 Candy (disambiguation)
 Kandy (disambiguation)
 Kandis (disambiguation)